Anton Forsberg (born 27 November 1992) is a Swedish professional ice hockey goaltender for the Ottawa Senators of the National Hockey League (NHL). He was selected by the Columbus Blue Jackets in the seventh round (188th overall) of the 2011 NHL Entry Draft. Forsberg also played for the Lake Erie Monsters and went undefeated during the playoffs en route to winning the 2016 Calder Cup playoffs.

Playing career

Swedish Hockey League
Forsberg played in his native Sweden as a youth with Modo Hockey. In the 2011–12 season, Forsberg made his senior debut with Modo in the top tier Elitserien. He was eventually drafted 188th overall by the Columbus Blue Jackets during the 2011 NHL Entry Draft.

The year following his draft, he was selected to compete for Team Sweden at the 2012 World Junior Ice Hockey Championships.

National Hockey League

Columbus Blue Jackets
On 28 May 2013, the Columbus Blue Jackets signed Forsberg to a three-year, entry-level contract, and he was assigned to play with the Springfield Falcons of the American Hockey League (AHL) after the completion of the 2013–14 SHL season. Forsberg subsequently played his first professional game in North America on 1 April 2014, stopping 25 of 26 shots to lead the Springfield Falcons to a 3–1 win over the Bridgeport Sound Tigers. During the 2014–15 AHL season, he helped the Falcons reach a new franchise record of 11 consecutive wins while playing in 10 of those games. As a result of his success, Forsberg made his NHL debut 1 November 2014 against the New Jersey Devils at the Prudential Center.

In his second season in North America, Forsberg continued playing in the American Hockey League with the Lake Erie Monsters. During this season, he helped lead the team to the 2016 Calder Cup playoffs where they clinched their first Calder Cup championship in franchise history by winning all nine starts in the playoffs. It was during this season that Forsberg was recalled to the National Hockey League on an emergency basis. After being recalled from the AHL, Forsberg recorded his first career NHL win and became the first goaltender to do so after entering the game post-regulation. On 17 June 2016, Forsberg was signed to a one-year contract extension to remain within the Blue Jackets organization.

After attending the Blue Jackets training camp, Forsberg was reassigned to the American Hockey League to begin the 2016–17 season. On 10 January 2017, Forsberg made his first 2016–17 season appearance for the Blue Jackets in a 5–3 loss to the Carolina Hurricanes.

Chicago and Carolina
On 23 June 2017, Forsberg was traded by the Blue Jackets, alongside Brandon Saad and a fifth-round pick in 2018, to the Chicago Blackhawks in exchange for Artemi Panarin, Tyler Motte and a sixth-round pick in 2017. Three days later, on 26 June, Forsberg was signed to a two-year contract with the Blackhawks. This would be his last season with the Blackhawks as on 24 June 2019, Forsberg was traded to the Carolina Hurricanes along with Gustav Forsling in exchange for Calvin de Haan and Aleksi Saarela.

Forsberg left the Hurricanes at the conclusion of his contract and as a free agent agreed to sign a one-year, $700,000 contract with the Edmonton Oilers on 9 October 2020. Prior to the start of the 2020–21 season, Forsberg was waived by the Oilers and subsequently claimed and reacquired by the Carolina Hurricanes on 12 January 2021. Claimed to provide insurance for the waiving of former teammate, Alex Nedeljkovic, Forsberg was returned on waivers once Nedeljkovic cleared and was claimed by the Winnipeg Jets on 16 January 2021.

Ottawa Senators
After two months on the Jets roster without featuring for the club, Forsberg continued his journeyman season after he was claimed off waivers from the Jets by the Ottawa Senators on 17 March 2021. Forsberg played one game for Ottawa's AHL affiliate, the Belleville Senators, then was recalled to Ottawa. Forsberg suited up for the first time with Ottawa on 22 March in a backup role, and started in net on 25 March. On 5 May, Forsberg signed a one-year contract extension with the Senators. He served as backup to Matt Murray in Ottawa's net, though was initially acquired due to a series of injuries to the goaltenders in the Senators franchise.

For the 2021–22 season, Forsberg started as Murray's backup. However, Murray's poor play and injuries allowed Forsberg to became the starter, and he appeared in 46 games for the Senators. On 27 December 2021, the Senators placed Forsberg in COVID-19 protocol. On 21 March 2022, the Senators signed Forsberg to a three-year, $8.25 million contract extension that carries a $2.75 million per year.

Personal life
Forsberg's father is a trainer and chiropractor in Sweden for a professional ice hockey team.

Career statistics

Regular season and playoffs

International

Awards and honors

References

External links
 

1992 births
Living people
Belleville Senators players
Carolina Hurricanes players
Charlotte Checkers (2010–) players
Chicago Blackhawks players
Cleveland Monsters players
Columbus Blue Jackets draft picks
Columbus Blue Jackets players
Lake Erie Monsters players
Modo Hockey players
Ottawa Senators players
Rockford IceHogs (AHL) players
Södertälje SK players
Springfield Falcons players
Swedish ice hockey goaltenders
Swedish expatriate ice hockey people
People from Härnösand
Sportspeople from Västernorrland County